Vietnam competed at the 2020 Summer Olympics in Tokyo. Originally scheduled to take place from 24 July to 9 August 2020, the Games were postponed to 23 July to 8 August 2021, due to the COVID-19 pandemic. It was the nation's tenth appearance at the Olympics as a reunified republic, six of which under the banner of the State of Vietnam or South Vietnam. The delegation finished without a medal for the first time since 2004 Summer Olympics.

Competitors
The following is the list of number of competitors in the Games.

Archery

Two Vietnamese archers qualified for the men's and women's individual recurve, respectively, at the Games, by reaching the semifinal stage and obtaining one of three available spots each at the 2019 Asian Championships in Bangkok, Thailand.

Athletics

Vietnam received a universality slot from the World Athletics to send a female track and field athlete to the Olympics.

Track & road events

Badminton

Vietnam entered two badminton players for each of the following events into the Olympic tournament based on the BWF Race to Tokyo Rankings.

Boxing 

Vietnam entered two boxer into the Olympic tournament for the first time since Seoul 1988. 2019 Southeast Asian Games silver medalist Nguyễn Văn Đương scored an outright quarterfinal victory to secure a spot in the men's featherweight division at the 2020 Asia & Oceania Qualification Tournament in Amman, Jordan, while Nguyễn Thị Tâm replacing the North Korean slots after withdrawn from the Olympics.

Gymnastics

Artistic
Vietnam entered one artistic gymnast into the Olympic competition. Lê Thanh Tùng secured one of the three spots available for individual-based gymnasts, neither part of the team nor qualified through the all-around, in the vault exercise at the 2019 World Championships in Stuttgart, Germany.

2021 Asian Championships in Hangzhou, China did not take place, so Đinh Phương Thành is the next highest ranked eligible All-Around athlete based on the All-Around results from Qualifications of the 2019 World Championships, will be earned 1 quota place. 

Men

Judo

Vietnam entered one female judoka into the Olympic tournament with reallocated continental quota.

Rowing

Vietnam qualified one boat in the women's lightweight double sculls for the Games by winning the silver medal and securing the second of three berths available at the 2021 FISA Asia & Oceania Olympic Qualification Regatta in Tokyo, Japan.

Qualification Legend: FA=Final A (medal); FB=Final B (non-medal); FC=Final C (non-medal); FD=Final D (non-medal); FE=Final E (non-medal); FF=Final F (non-medal); SA/B=Semifinals A/B; SC/D=Semifinals C/D; SE/F=Semifinals E/F; QF=Quarterfinals; R=Repechage

Shooting

Vietnam entered one shooter at the games, after getting the allocation quotas.

Swimming

Vietnamese swimmers further achieved qualifying standards in the following events (up to a maximum of 2 swimmers in each event at the Olympic Qualifying Time (OQT), and potentially 1 at the Olympic Selection Time (OST)):

Taekwondo

Vietnam entered one athlete into the taekwondo competition at the Games. Trương Thị Kim Tuyến secured a spot in the women's flyweight category (49 kg) with a top two finish at the 2021 Asian Qualification Tournament in Amman, Jordan.

Weightlifting

Vietnamese weightlifters qualified for three quota places at the games, based on the Tokyo 2020 Rankings Qualification List of 11 June 2021. They lost one of its three berths at the coming Olympics due to previous doping violations. The International Testing Agency has forced the country to remove one female berth as punishment after four of the country’s athletes tested positive for banned drugs in 2019 and 2020.

See also
Vietnam at the 2020 Summer Paralympics

References

External links 

Nations at the 2020 Summer Olympics
2020
2021 in Vietnamese sport